Willem Philippe "Wim" de Bie (born 17 May 1939) is a Dutch comedian, writer and singer. He formed the comedy duo Van Kooten en De Bie with Kees van Kooten.

Early life 
Willem Philippe de Bie was born on 17 May 1939 in The Hague, Netherlands. He went to the Dalton Lyceum in The Hague, where he followed a HBS program. At this school he met Kees van Kooten, with whom he would form the comedy duo Van Kooten en De Bie.

Career 

De Bie made several radio and television shows. He also wrote multiple books.

Bibliography 
 1970: Lachen is gezond
 1972–1986: De 
 1986: Bescheuragenda 1986
 1986: Het groot bescheurboek
 1987: Meneer Foppe en het gedoe
 1988: De boekcorner van... Goos Verhoef!
 1988: Schoftentuig
 1990: Morgen zal ik mijn mannetje staan
 1992: De liefste van de buis
 1993: Ons kent ons
 1994: Meneer Foppe in zijn blootje
 1995: Meneer Foppe over de rooie
 1997: Different koek!
 2009: Meneer Foppe & de hele reutemeteut

Discography 

Wim de Bie released several solo albums.
 1984: De Bie zingt (only released as LP)
 1990: De Bie zingt a capella (cd-version with more songs than on the LP)
 1996: De fluiten van ver weg: De wereldmuziek der Cananefaten
 1997: Marylou (single; B-side: Het valt wel mee)

References

External links 

  Weblog of Wim de Bie
 Lambiek Comiclopedia article.

1939 births
Living people
Dutch cabaret performers
Dutch male comedians
Dutch male writers
Dutch male actors
Dutch male singers
Dutch comedy musicians
Dutch television writers
Male television writers
Writers from The Hague
Entertainers from The Hague